The Commandment of Love (German: Das Gebot der Liebe) is a 1919 German silent film.

Cast
In alphabetical order
 Herbert Apel
 Ernst Behmer as Oskar Price 
 Olga Engl 
 Rita Georg 
 Rose Lichtenstein
 Eva May 
 Hermann Picha as Prokurist Hart  
 Karl Platen 
 Johannes Riemann
 Hermann Thimig

References

Bibliography
 Hans-Michael Bock and Tim Bergfelder. The Concise Cinegraph: An Encyclopedia of German Cinema. Berghahn Books.

External links

1919 films
Films of the Weimar Republic
German silent feature films
Films directed by Erik Lund
German black-and-white films
1910s German films